This is the complete list of Speedway World Cup medalists from 2001 to 2015. This competition replaced the Speedway World Team Cup in 2001 and was replaced by the Speedway of Nations in 2018.

Medalists

See also 
 motorcycle speedway
 Speedway World Team Cup

!
Speedway World Cup